This is a list of state prisons in Wisconsin. It does not include federal prisons or county jails located in the state of Wisconsin.

Prisons
 Chippewa Valley Correctional Treatment Facility (formerly Highview; inmate operating capacity 450)
 Columbia Correctional Institution (capacity 541)
 Dodge Correctional Institution
 Fox Lake Correctional Institution
 Green Bay Correctional Institution
 Jackson Correctional Institution (capacity 988)
 Kettle Moraine Correctional Institution
 Milwaukee Secure Detention Facility (capacity 1040)
 New Lisbon Correctional Institution (capacity 1010)
 Oakhill Correctional Institution (capacity 688)
 Oshkosh Correctional Institution
 Prairie du Chien Correctional Institution (capacity 424)
 Racine Correctional Institution (capacity 1798)
 Racine Youthful Offender Correctional Facility (capacity 927)
 Redgranite Correctional Institution
 Stanley Correctional Institution (capacity 1550)
 Sturtevant Transitional Facility (capacity 304)
 Taycheedah Correctional Institution (women's prison, capacity 898)
 Waupun Correctional Institution
 Wisconsin Secure Program Facility

Correctional centers

The correctional centers system contains 16 relatively small minimum-security facilities, three of which house female inmates.

 Black River Correctional Center (capacity 114)
 Drug Abuse Correctional Center (capacity 300)
 Felmers O. Chaney Correctional Center (capacity 100)
 Flambeau Correctional Center (capacity 80)
 Gordon Correctional Center (capacity 80)
 John C. Burke Correctional Center (capacity 280)
 Kenosha Correctional Center (capacity 115) 
 Marshall E. Sherrer Correctional Center (capacity 58)
 Milwaukee Women's Correctional Center (women's prison, capacity 112)
 McNaughton Correctional Center (capacity 102)
 Oregon Correctional Center (capacity 120)
 Robert E. Ellsworth Correctional Center (women's prison, capacity 333)
 Sanger B. Powers Correctional Center (capacity 70)
 St. Croix Correctional Center (capacity 120 male and 12 female)
 Thompson Correctional Center (capacity 120)
 Winnebago Correctional Center (capacity 250)

References

External links

Wisconsin Department of Corrections

 
Wisconsin
Prisons